Rahi is a village in the Union Council of Phallah, Abbottabad District, Khyber Pakhtunkhwa, Pakistan. It is located in the south west of the district.

Until the local government reforms of 2000 Rahi was a separate Union Council to Phalla, Mr. Shakil Abbasi the famous player of Pakistan Hockey comes from this village. The Nazim of Union Council Phalla comes from Rahi. The Abbasi tribe form a majority  of the inhabitants.

Location 
Rahi is located in northern part of the Union Councils - its western border is with Abbottabad District.  Rahi is a very beautiful village, situated on the hallow part of the mountain. The River Haro flows alongside it. there  are two parts of village rahi one is dakhli rahi and other one is kharji rahi in dakhli rahi main areas are maqaam, pari pandi, dehri, teri, and many others areas and in kharji rahi main mohallay are chankot, sohni bari, tiar gali, seher, berwala, tialian, teriaan, etc.

References

Populated places in Abbottabad District